Hugues Quiéret ( 129024 June 1340) was a French nobleman, admiral and military commander. He was a knight, lord of Tours-en-Vimeu and of Hamicourt, both in Picardy. Before becoming an admiral, he was an advisor, Chamberlain, Grand Master of France, then the seneschal of Beaucaire and Nimes from 1325 to 1332. 

He was made an admiral, then captain of Tournay, then an Admiral of France. After several victories, he commanded the French fleet at the Battle of Sluys in 1340, during the Hundred Years' War between France and England, and was wounded, captured and beheaded by the English.

Family 
Hugues's father was also called Hugues; he was a knight and the Lord of Douriez and Fransu. The Quiéret family claimed descent from lords in Picardy, although no genealogy can be produced. They bore a coat of arms blazoned as "Ermine, three fleurs de lys at the foot fed gules, two lions for supporters", originating in Hugues Quiéret's marriage in 1312 to Blanche d'Harcourt. Blanche's grandfather, Jean II d'Harcourt (1240–1302), known as 'The Doughty', was a Marshal of France from 1283 and one of the first Admirals of France, from 1295. Hugues and Blanche had several children.

Career

Sénéchal de Beaucaire et de Nîmes (1324) 

Hugues Quieret was made sénéchal of Beaucaire, an important port for galleys, and of Nîmes. He was given orders to escort the Comtesse de Blois from Montpellier to the Château de Corbeil. He was involved in the Gascony War in 1326, and signed an order on 8 May 1332 suppressing the fair at Montagnac.

Admiral (1335) 
Under the reign of Philip VI of France the post of Admiral of France had been reformed, and ceased to be assigned to foreigners, as had previously been the case, and was instead granted to Quiéret as a prominent French noble on 7 December 1335. This did not make him supreme commander of the French fleet, however, but instead the subordinate of Raoul II de Brienne, the Constable of France and Captain General Above and Before All Others of the Army of the Sea, even if Raoul proved a non-entity. Quiéret sought help from the Count of Flanders in 1336 with the galleys of the Levant (Levant signifying in this case 'east', or 'eastern'). Quiéret was good at organising the fleet, playing a large part in improving the arsenals at  Leure (beside Harfleur) and at the Cloes des Galées. However, he was to prove better at organisation than at actual naval combat.

Invasion of England (1338) 
The provinces promised to provide ships to invade England. These ships' aim was to join up with the French king's ships and transport 4,000 men at arms to England, the whole force being known as The Grand Army of the Sea. Preparations were put underway for this expedition in Harfleur and Leure - the latter had been established in the high Middle Ages on the sea-shore of the Seine and on a loop formed by the course of the Lézarde, winding through and joining up the marshlands of the estuary, to the south-west of Harfleur (in 1339 the port at Leure provided 32 ships and 3 galleys for Philip's fleet, more than the output of the ports of Dieppe and Harfleur combined). The preparations are evidenced by a command of 8 November 1338 in which Quiéret commissioned Thomas Fouques, Custodian of the Park of the Galleys of the King, which installation was then at Rouen (and known as the Cloes des Galées, or the Clos de Rouen; the oldest arsenal in France), to buy at any price the weapons which the mercenaries gathered at Leure and Harfleur had sold off to merchants, and which he proposed they instead take on the expedition. However, the most important document on the preparations is the 'quittance' of 2 July 1338 which proved the fleet used gunpowder, the first documentation of French naval artillery.

The Collection des chroniques nationales françaises writes:

It continues

Quiéret also burned English ships at Bristol and Plymouth.

Battle of Arnemuiden (September 1338) 
The Battle of Arnemuiden was a naval battle on 23 September 1338, at the start of the Hundred Years' War, featuring a French fleet under Admirals Hugues Quiéret and Nicolas Béhuchet against a small squadron of five English great cogs, transporting a cargo of wool to the Count of Flanders, ally of Edward III of England. It occurred near Arnemuiden, the port of the island of Walcheren in the Netherlands. Overwhelmed by the superior numbers and with some of their crew still on shore, the English ships fought bravely, especially the Christopher with its three cannon and one hand gun (the battle was the first recorded instance of European usage of naval artillery) under the command of John Kingston, who was also commander of the squadron.. Kingston only surrendered after a day's fighting and exhausting every means of defence. The French captured the rich cargo and took the five cogs into their fleet, but massacred the English prisoners.
Hugues Quieret was then made captain of Tournay in 1339.

Battle of Sluys 

The chronicles write:

On 24 June 1340, the Battle of Sluys in the Zwin estuary (an arm of the sea, now silted up, which led to Bruges) pitched the numerically dominant French fleet against 150 English ships commanded by Edward III. This was the first major battle of the Hundred Years' War. Besides forty Mediterranean galleys with experienced Genoese crews led by the mercenary Pietro Barbavera, the French also had twenty 'coques' (cogs) crewed by 200 men at arms and around 130 merchant and fishing ships, each with fifty soldiers on board - this made a total of around 30,000 men. The English fleet had 150 ships, 15,000 soldiers and an unknown number of crewmen. The French fleet was commanded by Quiéret and Béhuchet, but they were administrators ordered in principal merely to guarantee an army's safe passage, not frontline fighting sailors. They were ordered to stop Edward's army landing and deployed their fleet in three lines from one river bank to the other, except for four cogs and the Genoese ships; all the ships in the three rows were chained together (presumably to aid in taking advantage of their numbers and armor).

On the morning of 24 June the English appeared. At midday, born down by the tide and wind, they attacked. The French crossbowmen had the initiative but were quickly outmatched by the Welsh longbowmen's speed of fire. After the fleets met there was fierce hand-to-hand fighting. Quieret and Béhuchet tried to surround Edward's ship, the Cog Thomas, and Béhuchet was wounded in the chest. Some sources have Quiéret drowning during the battle, but others state he was captured and immediately beheaded by the English, despite his wounds, in vengeance for the massacre he had allowed at Arnemuiden two years earlier, with his body being thrown into the sea. (Béhuchet was also captured, and hanged.) In the afternoon, thanks to a change in the wind direction, the Flemish fleet was able to leave the river bank and join the battle. Panic gripped the French fleet - having no way to escape other than to swim for it, 17 to 20 thousand French soldiers were killed and only Barbavera and half the Genoese managed to escape. The battle marked the French fleet's destruction and decisive defeat.

References

Bibliography 
 
 
 
 
 
 

1290 births
1340 deaths
13th-century French people
14th-century French people
People of the Hundred Years' War
French military personnel killed in action
Admirals of France